Sikkal Navaneetheswarar Temple is a Hindu temple located at Sikkal  in Nagapattinam district, Tamil Nadu, India. 
The temple is dedicated to Shiva, as the moolavar presiding deity, in his manifestation as Navaneetheswarar and Vennailingeswarar (Thiruvennainathar). His consort, Parvati, is known as Velvizhinadunkanni.

Significance 
It is one of the shrines of the 275 Paadal Petra Sthalams - Shiva Sthalams glorified in the early medieval Tevaram poems by Tamil Saivite Nayanar Tirugnanasambandar.

Sikkal Singaravelan Temple
Sikkal Singaravelan Temple is found in the premises of this Siva temple.

References

External links 
 
 

Padal Petra Stalam
Maadakkoil
Shiva temples in Nagapattinam district